These are all the TGV (meaning high-speed train) stations, listed alphabetically. This list includes new stations constructed specifically for the TGV as well as existing stations that are simply served by the trains.

Stations located in countries other than France are marked with the country in parentheses.

A 

 Aachen Hauptbahnhof (Germany)
 Aéroport Charles de Gaulle 2 TGV
 Agde
 Agen
 Aigle railway station (Switzerland)
 Aime-La Plagne
 Aix-en-Provence TGV
 Aix-les-Bains-Le Revard
 Albertville
 Amsterdam Centraal station (Netherlands)
 Angers-Saint-Laud
 Angoulême
 Annecy
 Annemasse
 Antibes
 Antwerpen-Centraal railway station (Belgium)
 Arcachon
 Les Arcs-Draguignan
 Arles
 Arras
 Augsburg Hauptbahnhof (Germany)
 Auray
 Avignon-Centre
 Avignon TGV

B 
 Baden-Baden station (Germany)
 Barcelona Sants railway station (Spain)
 Bardonecchia (Italy)
 Basel SBB railway station (Switzerland)
 La Baule
 Bayonne
 Beaune
 Belfort – Montbéliard TGV
 Bellegarde
 Bern railway station (Switzerland)
 Besançon Franche-Comté TGV
 Besançon-Viotte
 Béthune
 Béziers
 Biarritz
 Biganos-Facture
 Bordeaux-Saint-Jean
 Boulogne-sur-Mer
 Bourg-en-Bresse
 Bourg-Saint-Maurice
 Brest
 Brig railway station (Switzerland)
 Brussels-South railway station (Belgium)

C 
 Calais-Fréthun
 Calais-Ville
 Cannes
 Carcassonne
 Chalon-sur-Saône
 Châteauroux
 Chambéry-Challes-les-Eaux
 Champagne-Ardenne TGV
 Châtellerault
 Colmar
 Cologne Hauptbahnhof (Germany)
 Le Creusot TGV
 Le Croisic
 Croix-Wasquehal
 Culoz

D 
 Dax
 Dijon-Ville
 Dol-de-Bretagne
 Dole-Ville
 Douai
 Duisburg Hauptbahnhof (Germany)
 Dunkerque
 Dortmund Hauptbahnhof (Germany)
 Düsseldorf Airport station (Germany)
 Düsseldorf Hauptbahnhof (Germany)

E 
 Emmendingen (Germany)
 Épinal
 Gare d'Épernay
 Essen Hauptbahnhof (Germany)
 Évian-les-Bains

F 
 Figueres–Vilafant (Spain)
 Forbach
 Frankfurt (Main) Hauptbahnhof (Germany)
 Frasne
 Freiburg Hauptbahnhof (Germany)
 Futuroscope

G 
 Genève-Cornavin (Switzerland)
 Girona railway station (Spain)
 Grenoble
 Guingamp

H 

 TGV Haute-Picardie
 Le Havre
 Hazebrouck
 Hyères

K 
 Kaiserslautern Hauptbahnhof (Germany)
 Karlsruhe Hauptbahnhof (Germany)

L 

 Lahr (Schwarzw) (Germany)
 Lamballe
 Landerneau
 Landry
 Lannion
 Lausanne railway station (Switzerland)
 Laval
 Lens
 Leuk railway station (Switzerland)
 Libourne
 Gare de Liège-Guillemins (Belgium)
 Lille-Europe
 Lille-Flandres
 London-St Pancras railway station (England)
 Lorient
 Lorraine TGV
 Lourdes
 Luxembourg railway station (Luxembourg)
 Lyon-Part-Dieu
 Lyon-Perrache
 Lyon-Saint-Exupéry TGV

M 

 Mâcon-Ville
 Mâcon-Loché TGV
 Mannheim Hauptbahnhof (Germany)
 Le Mans
 Mantes-la-Jolie
 Marne-la-Vallée–Chessy TGV
 Marseille-Saint-Charles
 Martigny railway station (Switzerland)
 Massy TGV
 Menton
 Metz-Ville
 Meuse TGV
 Milano Porta Garibaldi railway station (Italy)
 Miramas
 Monaco-Monte-Carlo (Monaco)
 Modane
 Montauban-Ville-Bourbon
 Montbard
 Montpellier-Saint-Roch
 Montreux railway station (Switzerland)
 Morlaix
 Mouchard
 Moûtiers-Salins-Brides-les-Bains
 Mulhouse-Ville
 Müllheim (Baden) (Germany)
 München Hauptbahnhof (Germany)

N 

 Nancy-Ville
 Nantes
 Narbonne
 Neuchâtel railway station (Switzerland)
 Nice-Ville
 Niort
 Nîmes
 Novara railway station (Italy)
 Nurieux

O 
 Offenburg (Germany)
 Orange
 Oulx-Cesana-Claviere (Italy)

P 

 Paris-Est
 Paris-Lyon
 Paris-Montparnasse
 Paris-Nord
 Pau
 Perpignan
 Plouaret-Trégor
 Poitiers
 Pornichet
 Le Pouliguen

Q 
 Quimper
 Quimperlé

R 

 Redon
 Reims
 Remiremont
 Rennes
 La Rochelle
 La Roche-sur-Yon
 Rotterdam Centraal station (Netherlands)
 Rosporden
 Roubaix
 Rouen-Rive-Droite
 Ruffec

S 

 Saarbrücken Hauptbahnhof (Germany)
 Sablé-sur-Sarthe
 Les Sables-d'Olonne
 Saint-Avre-La Chambre
 Saint-Brieuc
 Saint-Dié-des-Vosges
 Saint-Étienne-Châteaucreux
 Saint-Gervais-les-Bains-Le Fayet
 Saint-Jean-de-Luz
 Saint-Jean-de-Maurienne
 Saint-Maixent (Deux-Sèvres)
 Saint-Malo
 Saint-Michel-Valloire
 Saint-Nazaire
 Saint-Omer
 Saint-Pierre-des-Corps
 Saint-Raphaël-Valescure
 Sallanches
 Saumur
 Schiphol Airport (Netherlands)
 Sens
 Sète
 La Souterraine
 Spiez railway station (Switzerland)
 Strasbourg-Ville
 Stuttgart Hauptbahnhof (Germany)
 Surgères

T 
 Tarbes
 La Teste
 Thionville
 Thonon-les-Bains
 Thun railway station (Switzerland)
 Toulon
 Toulouse-Matabiau
 Tourcoing
 Tours
 Torino Porta Susa railway station (Italy)

U 
 Ulm Hauptbahnhof (Germany)

V 
 Valence TGV
 Valence-Ville
 Valenciennes
 Vallorbe railway station (Switzerland)
 Vannes
 Vendôme-Villiers-sur-Loir TGV
 Vercelli railway station (Italy)
 Versailles-Chantiers
 Ventimiglia railway station (Italy)
 Visp railway station (Switzerland)
 Vitré

Z 

 Zürich Hauptbahnhof (Switzerland)

References 

TGV